

Day 1 (26 May)
Schedule of Play
 Seeds out:
 Women's Singles:  Nadia Petrova [11],  Venus Williams [30]

Day 2 (27 May)
Schedule of Play
 Seeds out:
 Men's Singles:  Tomáš Berdych [5],  Juan Mónaco [17],  Marcel Granollers [31]
 Women's Singles:  Ekaterina Makarova [22],  Julia Görges [24],  Tamira Paszek [28]

Day 3 (28 May)
Schedule of Play
 Seeds out:
 Men's Singles:  Alexandr Dolgopolov [22],  Florian Mayer [28]
 Men's Doubles:  Mahesh Bhupathi /  Rohan Bopanna [4],  Daniele Bracciali /  Fabio Fognini [14]

Day 4 (29 May)
Schedule of Play
 Seeds out:
 Women's Singles:  Caroline Wozniacki [10],  Anastasia Pavlyuchenkova [19],  Klára Zakopalová [23],  Lucie Šafářová [25]
 Men's Doubles:  Santiago González /  Scott Lipsky [11],  Julian Knowle /  Filip Polášek [15]
 Women's Doubles:  Liezel Huber /  María José Martínez Sánchez [5],  Daniela Hantuchová /  Anabel Medina Garrigues [16]

Day 5 (30 May)
Schedule of Play
 Seeds out:
 Women's Singles:  Li Na [6],  Dominika Cibulková [16],  Yaroslava Shvedova [27]
 Men's Doubles:  Colin Fleming /  Jonathan Marray [10]
 Women's Doubles:  Raquel Kops-Jones /  Abigail Spears [6], Serena Williams /  Venus Williams [12]

Day 6 (31 May)
Schedule of Play
 Seeds out:
 Men's Singles:  Marin Čilić [10],  Milos Raonic [14],  Sam Querrey [18],  Andreas Seppi [20],  Jérémy Chardy [25],  Julien Benneteau [30]
 Women's Singles:  Kirsten Flipkens [21],  Sorana Cîrstea [26],  Varvara Lepchenko [29],  Sabine Lisicki [32]
 Men's Doubles:  Robert Lindstedt /  Daniel Nestor [3]
 Women's Doubles:  Ashleigh Barty /  Casey Dellacqua [14]
 Mixed's Doubles:  Sania Mirza /  Robert Lindstedt [1],  Elena Vesnina /  Max Mirnyi [2]

Day 7 (1 June)
Schedule of Play
 Seeds out:
 Men's Singles:  Janko Tipsarević [8],  John Isner [19],  Jerzy Janowicz [21],  Benoît Paire [24],  Grigor Dimitrov [26],  Fabio Fognini [27]
 Women's Singles:  Petra Kvitová [7],  Samantha Stosur [9],  Marion Bartoli [13],  Alizé Cornet [31]
 Men's Doubles:  Max Mirnyi /  Horia Tecău [5],  Jürgen Melzer /  Leander Paes [9]
 Women's Doubles:  Hsieh Su-wei /  Peng Shuai [8]
 Mixed's Doubles:  Casey Dellacqua /  Mahesh Bhupathi [7]

Day 8 (2 June)
Schedule of Play
 Seeds out:
 Men's Singles:  Nicolás Almagro [11],  Gilles Simon [15],  Kevin Anderson [23]
 Women's Singles:  Angelique Kerber [8],  Ana Ivanovic [14],  Roberta Vinci [15],  Carla Suárez Navarro [20]
 Men's Doubles:  Julien Benneteau /  Nenad Zimonjić [13]
 Women's Doubles:  Anna-Lena Grönefeld /  Květa Peschke [9],  Chan Hao-ching /  Darija Jurak [15]
 Mixed Doubles:  Anna-Lena Grönefeld /  Horia Tecău [6]

Day 9 (3 June)
Schedule of Play
 Seeds out:
 Men's Singles:  Richard Gasquet [7],  Kei Nishikori [13],  Philipp Kohlschreiber [16],  Mikhail Youzhny [29]
 Women's Singles:  Sloane Stephens [17]
 Men's Doubles:  Aisam-ul-Haq Qureshi /  Jean-Julien Rojer [6]
 Women's Doubles:  Shuai Zhang /  Zheng Jie [13]
 Mixed Doubles:  Katarina Srebotnik /  Nenad Zimonjić [3]

Day 10 (4 June)
Schedule of Play
 Seeds out:
 Men's Singles:  Roger Federer [2],  Tommy Robredo [32]
 Women's Singles:  Agnieszka Radwańska [4]
 Men's Doubles:  Marcel Granollers /  Marc López [2],  Ivan Dodig /  Marcelo Melo [12]
 Women's Doubles:  Bethanie Mattek-Sands /  Sania Mirza [7]

Day 11 (5 June)
Schedule of Play
 Seeds out:
 Men's Singles:  Stanislas Wawrinka [9],  Tommy Haas [12]
 Women's Singles:  Maria Kirilenko [12],  Jelena Janković [18]
 Men's Doubles:  David Marrero /  Fernando Verdasco [8],  Mariusz Fyrstenberg /  Marcin Matkowski [16]
 Women's Doubles:  Kristina Mladenovic /  Galina Voskoboeva [10],  Anastasia Pavlyuchenkova /  Lucie Šafářová [11]
 Mixed Doubles:  Lisa Raymond /  Bruno Soares [4],  Liezel Huber /  Marcelo Melo [8]

Day 12 (6 June)
 Schedule of Play
 Seeds out:
 Women's Singles:  Victoria Azarenka [3],  Sara Errani [5]
 Men's Doubles:  Alexander Peya /  Bruno Soares [7]
 Mixed Doubles:  Kristina Mladenovic /  Daniel Nestor [5]

Day 13 (7 June)
Schedule of Play
 Seeds out:
 Men's Singles:  Novak Djokovic [1],  Jo-Wilfried Tsonga [6]
 Women's Doubles:  Andrea Hlaváčková /  Lucie Hradecká [2],  Nadia Petrova /  Katarina Srebotnik [3]

Day 14 (8 June)
Schedule of Play
 Seeds out:
 Women's Singles:  Maria Sharapova [2]

Day 15 (9 June)
Schedule of Play
 Seeds out:
 Men's Singles:  David Ferrer [4]
 Women's Doubles:  Sara Errani /  Roberta Vinci [1]

Day-by-day summaries
French Open by year – Day-by-day summaries